Indian Institute of Information Technology, Ranchi (IIIT Ranchi or IIITR), is one of the Indian Institutes of Information Technology, a group of 25 Interdisciplinary Technical Universities of higher education started by Government of India, focused on Information Technology. It is an "Institute of National Importance", declared by an act of parliament.

At present, IIIT Ranchi is operating from its interim campus situated in Ranchi. 67 acres of land has been allotted for the permanent campus in Kanke, Ranchi. Construction has started and the campus will be ready by year 2023.

For the academic year 2022–2023, the Institute offers Bachelor of Technology (B.Tech.) courses in Computer Science and Engineering, CSE (with specialization Data Science and AI), Electronics and Communication Engineering and ECE (with specialization Embedded systems and Internet of Things). The Institute also offers Ph.D. courses in CSE and ECE branches.

Admissions to undergraduate programs are done along with the IITs, NITs & IIITs on the basis of the All-India Rank in the highly competitive exam (JEE- Main). Seats are filled through Joint Seat Allocation Authority, JOSAA, and the CSAB rounds.

Its permanent campus is under construction in Ranchi, Jharkhand.

Students' Council
A good administration and efficient Students' Council is a part of an able institution. The Students' Council represents the opinions, ideas and proposals of the students. It consists of 15 members.

Training and Placement Cell 
The purpose of training and placement cell is to give knowledge and skill to meet the industry requirement. Most of the students willing to enroll themselves to higher education, still our cell emphases on molding the students into versatile and technically sound product. To achieve our motto along with organizing campus drive for placement of students, we also enthusiastically focusing on organizing the workshops on hard and soft skill development, organize the seminars to enhance the intellectual skill and overall development of students.

Placement Statistics

2018 - 2022 Batch: Average Package - 12.80 LPA, Highest Package - 46 LPA.

Some of our Recruiters were: Google, Amazon, Intuit, Adobe, Zeotap, Productiv, Infoedge, Tekion, Synopsys, Samsung, Rakuten and many more.

References

External links
 

Ranchi
Universities and colleges in Ranchi
Educational institutions established in 2016
2016 establishments in Jharkhand